The African section of the 2018 FIFA World Cup qualification acted as qualifiers for the 2018 FIFA World Cup, held in Russia, for national teams which were members of the Confederation of African Football (CAF). A total of five slots in the final tournament were available for CAF teams.

The CAF Executive Committee approved the format for the qualifiers of the 2018 FIFA World Cup on 14 January 2015, with three preliminary rounds before a final group stage featuring 20 teams. The number of preliminary rounds was reduced to two, based on information provided by FIFA in early July 2015.

Format
The qualification structure was as follows:
First round: 26 teams, ranked 28–53, played home-and-away over two legs. The 13 winners advanced to the second round.
Second round: 40 teams, ranked 1–27 and 13 first round winners, played home-and-away over two legs. The 20 winners advanced to the third round.
Third round: 20 teams which had advanced from the second round were divided into five groups of four teams to play home-and-away round-robin matches. The winners of each group qualified for the 2018 FIFA World Cup.

Entrants
All 54 FIFA-affiliated football associations from CAF entered qualification. However, Zimbabwe were expelled from the competition on 12 March 2015 due to their failure to pay former coach José Claudinei a severance fee, a decision that the Zimbabwe Football Association unsuccessfully appealed against.

The July 2015 FIFA Rankings were used to seed the teams for the first two rounds, both of which were drawn in Russia on 25 July 2015. (World rankings shown in brackets)

Note: Niger had to enter the first round as they had fewer FIFA ranking points (345.31) than Benin (345.46) and Libya (345.35). In the FIFA World Rankings, teams share the same ranking if their ranking points round to the same whole number.

Schedule
The schedule of the competition was as follows.

First round

The draw for the first round was held as part of the 2018 FIFA World Cup Preliminary Draw on 25 July 2015, starting 18:00 MSK (UTC+3), at the Konstantinovsky Palace in Strelna, Saint Petersburg, Russia.

Second round

The draw for the second round was held as part of the 2018 FIFA World Cup Preliminary Draw on 25 July 2015, starting 18:00 MSK (UTC+3), at the Konstantinovsky Palace in Strelna, Saint Petersburg, Russia.

Third round

The draw for the third round was held on 24 June 2016, 17:00 EET (UTC+2), at the CAF headquarters in Cairo, Egypt.

Groups

Group A

Group B

Group C

Group D

Group E

Qualified teams
The following five teams qualified for the final tournament.

Top goalscorers
5 goals

 Préjuce Nakoulma
 Mohamed Salah

4 goals

 Islam Slimani
 Fiston Abdul Razak
 Firmin Ndombe Mubele
 William Jebor
 Khalid Boutaïb
 Moussa Maâzou
 Farouk Miya
 Naby Keïta

Fan behaviour
After Morocco qualified for the tournament with a 2–0 victory over Ivory Coast, the celebrations by the Moroccan community in Brussels turned into a riot with cars burnt, shops looted by some 300 rioters and 20 police officers injured. Firefighters sent to put out the fires were also attacked by the rioters.

Notes

References

External links

Qualifiers – Africa, FIFA.com
2018 FIFA World Cup Russia - Qualifiers, CAFonline.com

 
Caf
FIFA World Cup qualification (CAF)
2015 in African football
2016 in African football
2017 in African football